Alma is an unincorporated community in Ross County, in the U.S. state of Ohio.

History
A post office called Alma was established in 1869, and remained in operation until 1904. An early variant name was "Pleasant Valley".

References

Unincorporated communities in Ross County, Ohio
Unincorporated communities in Ohio
1869 establishments in Ohio